Dino Dolmagić (born 26 February 1994) is a Serbian football midfielder who plays for Javor Ivanjica.

References

External links
 

1994 births
Living people
People from Nova Varoš
Serbian footballers
Association football midfielders
FK Zemun players
FK Sloboda Užice players
FK Inđija players
FK Javor Ivanjica players
FK TSC Bačka Topola players
Serbian First League players
Serbian SuperLiga players